The borders of Brazil are the international borders that Brazil shares with neighbouring countries. Brazil has terrestrial boundaries with nine countries of South America, and with the French Department of Guiana. Brazil has borders with every country in South America with the exception of Chile and Ecuador, totalling . Brazil has the world's third longest land border, behind China and Russia.

Bordering countries
The lengths of the borders Brazil shares with different countries, running counter-clockwise around Brazil from French Guiana to Uruguay, are listed below: 

Brazil's coastline with the Atlantic Ocean is 7,491 km, which is more than twice the length of its border with Bolivia, the longest land border.

Border disputes

With Bolivia
Isla Suárez (Bolivian name), or Ilha de Guajará-mirim (Brazilian name), a river island on the Mamoré River is claimed by both Bolivia and Brazil.

With Uruguay
 A triangular region, named Rincão de Artigas in Portuguese, is controlled by Brazil and claimed by Uruguay. The dispute is due to a disagreement as to where a stream known as Arroyo de la Invernada begins and where it ends.
Brazilian Island, a river island at the junction of the Quaraí River and the Uruguay River on the border between Argentina, Brazil, and Uruguay is claimed by both Uruguay and Brazil. Brazil has de facto control of it.

Water falls
With many of Brazil's borders defined by rivers, there are several water falls along the border. The most notable border water falls include the Iguazu Falls on the border with Argentina and Orinduik Falls on the border with Guyana.

Until 1982, the border with Paraguay contained the Guaíra Falls. The falls were submerged following the construction of the Itaipu Dam.

Triple points

With 10 bordering countries forming a single incomplete ring around Brazil, the borders of Brazil include 9 triple points (also called tripoints) in which the borders of three countries join at a single point. A few of the triple points are notable:
Mount Roraima: The tripoint of Brazil, Guyana and Venezuela. Due to a border dispute between Venezuela and Guyana, Venezuela does not recognize this point as the tripoint.
Tres Fronteras: The tripoint of Brazil, Peru, and Colombia.
Assis Brasil, Bolpebra, Iñapari: The tripoint of Brazil, Bolivia, and Peru.
Triple Frontier: The tripoint of Brazil, Argentina, and Paraguay.
Brazilian Island: The tripoint of Brazil, Argentina, and Uruguay. Due to a border dispute between Brazil and Uruguay over the river island, the exact position of the tripoint is in dispute.

Borders over time

References